WAIJ is a non-profit, non-commercial corporation with studios and offices located along I-68 in Grantsville, Maryland. WAIJ was founded by the Johnson family and came on the air in 1984. WAIJ covers an area from Friendsville to Grantsville in Maryland.

External links
 
 

AIJ
AIJ
Radio stations established in 1984
1984 establishments in Maryland
American Family Radio stations
Religion in Cumberland, MD-WV-PA